Raster burn may refer to:

 Phosphor burn-in, a permanent disfigurement of a TV or computer monitor 
 Computer vision syndrome, eyestrain caused by excessive computer usage